Zenobia e Radamisto is an opera in 3 acts and nine scenes by composer Giovanni Legrenzi. The opera uses an Italian language libretto by Ippolito Bentivoglio (1611–1685). The third opera written by Legrenzi, the work premiered on 1 June 1665 at the Teatro Bonacossi in Ferrara in celebration of the marriage of Nicolò Santini and Maria Luisa Bonvisi. The opera was subsequently mounted in Brescia (1666), Verona (1667), and Macerata (1669).

Legrenzi revised the work for the Venice premiere of the opera at the Teatro San Salvatore on 26 December 1667. The revised opera also utilized an altered version of Bentivoglio's libretto by Nicolò Minato. In 2013 the Italian Academy of Musical Research published the original 1665 version of the libretto and the first critical edition of the score.

Roles
Tiridate, King of Assyria
Radamisto, disguised under the name of Creonte, King of Iberia and defeated King of Armenia
Zenobia, queen, wife of Radamisto
Doriclea, also under the name Ismene, Princess of the Parthian Empire
Casperio, Tiridate's general
Egisto, Doriclea's squire
Oreste, Tiridate's captain of the guard
Fidalba, Zenobia's handmaiden
Alceste, an Armenian sheppard
Ombra d'Armeno, Armenian wizard
Lico, court jester
Turpino, eunuch
Fama
Desiderio
Genio
Captain
Chorus of soldiers and victims of the mina volante

References

External links
English translation of the Italian libretto for Zenobia e Radamisto

Operas
1665 operas
Italian-language operas
Operas by Giovanni Legrenzi
Operas set in the 1st century
Works based on the Annals (Tacitus)